30 Days of Night is a horror comic book mini-series.

30 Days of Night may also refer to:

 Works based on the book series:
 30 Days of Night (film), a 2007 horror film based on the comic book
 30 Days of Night (novelization), the novelization of the 2007 film
 30 Days of Night: Blood Trails, a 2007 miniseries (prequel of the 2007 film)
 30 Days of Night: Dust to Dust,  a 2008 miniseries (sequel of the 2007 film)
 30 Days of Night: Dark Days, a 2010 horror film based on the comic book (sequel of the 2007 film)